Pascal Ackermann (born 17 January 1994) is a German cyclist, who currently rides for UCI WorldTeam .

Career
Born in Kandel, Ackermann joined the  team in 2013, and spent four seasons with the team. In August 2016  announced that Ackermann would join them for the 2017 season. In May 2019, he was named in the startlist for the Giro d'Italia, where he won the second and fifth stages, and became the first German rider to win the points classification in the Giro d'Italia. In October 2020, he was named in the startlist for the Vuelta a España, where he won the ninth and eighteenth stages.

Major results

2011
 2nd  Team sprint, UEC European Junior Track Championships
2012
 UEC European Junior Track Championships
1st  Omnium
3rd  Madison (with Domenic Weinstein)
2015
 1st Stage 2 Szlakiem Grodów Piastowskich
 2nd Neuseen Classics
 8th Road race, UEC European Under-23 Road Championships
 8th Münsterland Giro
2016
 1st  Road race, National Under-23 Road Championships
 Tour de Berlin
1st Stages 3b & 4
 2nd  Road race, UCI Under-23 Road World Championships
 3rd Münsterland Giro
 4th Road race, National Road Championships
 4th Overall Tour of Estonia
1st Young rider classification
 6th Kattekoers
 7th Rund um Köln
2017
 1st  Sprints classification, Tour of the Alps
 4th Road race, UEC European Road Championships
 5th Scheldeprijs
2018
 1st  Road race, National Road Championships
 1st London–Surrey Classic
 1st Brussels Cycling Classic
 1st Grand Prix de Fourmies
 Tour de Pologne
1st Stages 1 & 2
 1st Stage 2 Critérium du Dauphiné
 1st Stage 5 Tour de Romandie
 1st Stage 2 Tour of Guangxi
 2nd Three Days of Bruges–De Panne
 2nd Scheldeprijs
 3rd Handzame Classic
 5th Münsterland Giro
2019
 1st Eschborn–Frankfurt
 1st Clásica de Almería
 1st Bredene Koksijde Classic
 1st Grand Prix de Fourmies
 1st Gooikse Pijl
 Giro d'Italia
1st  Points classification
1st Stages 2 & 5
 Tour of Guangxi
1st  Points classification
1st Stages 3 & 6
 Tour de Pologne
1st Stages 1 & 3
 1st Stage 1 Deutschland Tour
 1st Stage 1 Tour of Slovenia
 1st  Points classification, Volta ao Algarve
 2nd Brussels Cycling Classic
 2nd Münsterland Giro
 2nd Nokere Koerse
 2nd Primus Classic
 3rd  Road race, UEC European Road Championships
2020
 1st Clásica de Almería
 Vuelta a España
1st Stages 9 & 18 
 Tirreno–Adriatico
1st  Points classification
1st Stage 1 & 2
 Sibiu Cycling Tour
1st Stages 2 & 3b
 1st Stage 1 UAE Tour
 2nd Road race, National Road Championships
 2nd Trofeo Campos, Porreres, Felanitx, Ses Salines
 2nd Trofeo de Playa de Palma – Palma
 3rd  Road race, UEC European Road Championships
 6th Brussels Cycling Classic
2021
 Settimana Ciclistica Italiana
1st  Points classification
1st Stages 2, 3 & 5
 Sibiu Cycling Tour
1st  Points classification
1st Prologue & Stage 3
 2nd Overall Deutschland Tour
1st  Points classification
1st Stage 1
 2nd Grand Prix de Fourmies
 3rd Classic Brugge–De Panne
 4th Elfstedenronde
 5th Eschborn–Frankfurt
 5th Grand Prix of Aargau Canton
 6th Scheldeprijs
 9th Münsterland Giro
2022
 1st Bredene Koksijde Classic
 1st Stage 4 Tour de Pologne
 8th Trofeo Alcúdia – Port d'Alcúdia
 9th Nokere Koerse
2023
 2nd Bredene Koksijde Classic

Grand Tour general classification results timeline

References

External links

1994 births
Living people
German male cyclists
People from Germersheim
German Giro d'Italia stage winners
German Vuelta a España stage winners
Cyclists from Rhineland-Palatinate
20th-century German people
21st-century German people